Prairie Hill is the name of multiple communities in the U.S. state of Texas:

Prairie Hill, Limestone County, Texas
Prairie Hill, Washington County, Texas